Tenebrous Liar (formerly known as Tenebrous) is a musical pseudonym of NME photographer and Careless Talk Costs Lives (magazine) founder, Steve Gullick.

Tenebrous Liar started as solo home recording project, inspired by the onset of boredom and depression in between photoshoots.

Since conception in 2005, the project grew in membership to become a four-part rock group and has gone on to record multiple studio albums. Throughout the years Tenebrous Liar has experienced frequent line up changes with Gullick remaining as the only constant member of the group. The band cites its musical influences to be acts such as Neil Young, Nirvana, The Stooges and The Velvet Underground. In contrast to this, reviewers and critics often describe the music as having a darker tone, using terms such as grimy rock and bleak  to describe the group's music. 

Tenebrous Liar have released seven studio albums, the most recent four being released on TV Records, produced by labelmate Richard Warren.

Live
Tenebrous Liar have played live with many artists over the years including Foo Fighters, Nick Cave and the Bad Seeds, Soulsavers, The Magic Numbers, Will Oldham, Richard Warren, Josh T. Pearson, Black Spiders, Oxbow (band), The Icarus Line, Arrows of Love, Blood Red Shoes, Underground Railroad (band), Cindytalk, John & Jen, Ed Harcourt and Scout Niblett.

Discography

Albums
 Tenebrous (January 2006)
 The Havering (April 2007)
 Liar (June 2007)
 Tenebrous Liar's Last Stand (October 2008)
 Jackknifed and Slaughtered (January 2010)
 Run Run Run (January 2011)
 End of the Road (October 2012)

Singles
 "Approaching Happy" (September 2007)
 "No Guiding Light" (September 2009)
 "Pretender EP" (November 2008)
 "Yellow Moon" (August 2006)

References

External links

Tenebrous Liar's official site

English alternative rock groups